Saturnz Return is the second studio album by Goldie, released on 27 January 1998. The album entered the UK Albums Chart at 15, however only spent four weeks on the chart in total. The album received mixed reviews upon release, with particular negative attention paid to the hour-long opening track "Mother".

Content and documentary
The album opens with the hour-long piece "Mother", which includes a "30-piece string section" and "classically trained child singers" and was intended to sonically represent Goldie being put up for adoption at age three by his mother, being raised in multiple children's homes and by various foster parents, as well as his life in the public eye after the success of his first album and becoming addicted to cocaine. Goldie said he felt he needed to make it, and described it as opening with a "beautiful piece of music that's the voice of a child who's not arrived yet" before "the whole thing descends, and it's being cast away [...] He's trying to find his way and he becomes a monster, and the beats become really complex and start to grow really fierce".

Goldie filmed an accompanying documentary, Goldie: When Saturn Returnz, about his search for his foster parents, in which he questioned his biological father and "chastis[ed]" his birth mother, which was considered "uncomfortable viewing" by Alexis Petridis of The Guardian. Goldie subsequently reconciled with his mother before her death, and she asked him to play the track at her funeral. He refused due to its length, but played the track on his headphones while seeing her body before her funeral. He stated that the experience of making the track "was what it was for. [...] It was for that simple moment."

Reception
Goldie said that his record label were expecting "something like [his] first album" Timeless after he had become the "poster boy for drum'n'bass" in the years following its release. The label listening to the hour-long "Mother" was dramatised in the 2008 John Niven novel Kill Your Friends, with Goldie claiming that their dissatisfaction with it was also "the end for one [label executive]'s career". The suite also divided British music critics at the time, who "were so perplexed that largely they chose to ignore the rest of the album" despite following tracks featuring David Bowie, Noel Gallagher and KRS-One.

Upon the album being reissued for its 21st anniversary in 2019, Goldie said that he "tried to tell [his label] no" but that they "insisted", saying that they believed "people should hear it now". He was still unsure whether they had come to "genuinely believe" in the album or if they were "trying to recoup the money they lost on it in the first place".

Track listing
CD pressing

The cassette release is identical to the second CD, with five songs on each side.

Vinyl pressing

Charts

References

1998 albums
Goldie albums